Lipiec may refer to:

 Lipiec, Pomeranian Voivodeship, a village in northern Poland
 Polish mead made from linden honey

People 
 Krzysztof Lipiec (born 1959), Polish politician
 Tomasz Lipiec (born 1971), Polish race walker and politician

See also